Ray Lewis Nelson Smillie (January 18, 1904 – April 21, 1993) was a Canadian boxer who competed in the 1928 Summer Olympics where he won the bronze medal in the welterweight class after winning the third place match against Robert Galataud.

Ray came from an athletic family. As a member of the Toronto YMCA, he was an avid gymnast, competing in the high bar, pommel horse and tumbling events. As part of the Argonaut's junior rowing team, he held the bow position. And in 1919 he won the gold medal in the Ontario Swimming Championships in the twenty-yard sprint. He also played football, tennis and golf. Ray's next endeavour into sports was a very successful career in boxing. In 1925, his first competitive year, he won the Ontario Championships and then advanced to the National Championships where he again won gold.

His accomplishments include:

1925 Canadian Amateur Welterweight Boxing Champion
Silver Medalist Pan-American match Boston Lion's Club Cup
1927 New England and Ontario Title
1928 Olympic trials in Montreal - qualified for the 1928 Summer Olympics in Amsterdam, the Netherlands
1928 Olympic Bronze Medalist Amsterdam Olympics
Refereed over 2,000 fights throughout the 1930s
Lieutenant Officer Canadian Navy, World War Two
Founder of Sault Ste. Marie Naval Vets

Ray was born in Toronto, Ontario to Sara Louise Winter and William Nelson Smillie. His younger brother, Donald, was also an athlete and played professional hockey for the Boston Bruins. He adored his younger sister Phyllis who was athletic and adventurous like her brothers.

He married Christina Fraser Carruthers in 1930. They had three children: John Donald Ray Smillie born in 1932 and twin girls, Caryl Margaret and Patricia Jean born in 1934.

Ray died in Sault Ste Marie, Ontario in 1993. He had six grandchildren from his son John who married Merrilou Paquette in 1955: June, Phyllis, Susan, Janet, Christine and Catherine Smillie. His daughter Caryl married Alvin Oja. They had four children, Eric, Mark, Marja-Liisa, and Stephanie. His daughter, Pat, married Gordon Wilson. They had three daughters, Karen, Colleen and Heather.

1928 Olympic results
Below is the record of Raymond Smillie, a Canadian welterweight boxer who competed at the 1928 Amsterdam Olympics:

 Round of 32: Defeated Johann Fraberger (Austria) on points
 Round of 16: Defeated Patrick Lenehan (Ireland) on points
 Quarterfinal: Defeated Kintaro Usuda (Japan) on points
 Semifinal: Lost to Raul Landini (Argentina) on points
 Bronze-Medal Bout: Defeated Robert Galataud (France) on points

References

 profile
profile

1904 births
1993 deaths
Boxers from Toronto
Boxers at the 1928 Summer Olympics
Olympic boxers of Canada
Olympic bronze medalists for Canada
Welterweight boxers
Olympic medalists in boxing
Canadian male boxers
Canadian military personnel of World War II
Royal Canadian Navy officers
Medalists at the 1928 Summer Olympics